= Koulfoua =

Koulfoua is an island on Lake Chad in Chad.

In summer 2015, thousands of Nigerian refugees settled on the island, fleeing Boko Haram. In December 2015, Koulfoua was attacked by suicide bombers. 30 people were reportedly killed, while over 200 were reported wounded.
